Ranjeev Deol (born October 19, 1976 in Lusaka, Zambia) is a Canadian field hockey player, who plays for West Coast Kings HC.

Career
He played club hockey in the Netherlands since 2003, first at HC Rotterdam then HC MOP and later on with HC Den Bosch and in Australia (Woodville HC). After his international career Ranjeev came back to The Netherlands and returned to HC MOP. After 2 seasons he left MOP and now he is playing for MHC MEP.

International career
Deol played in the 2008 Olympic Games (Beijing) and 2010 Hockey World Cup (Delhi) and played his first international senior tournament for the Men's National Team in 1998, at the Commonwealth Games in Kuala Lumpur.

In 2000 Deol missed the Summer Olympics in Sydney, where the Canadians finished tenth.

Personal life
His father Surjeet Singh Deol competed in field hockey for Kenya at two Olympic Games: 1956, 1960.

International senior competitions
 1998 — Commonwealth Games, Kuala Lumpur (not ranked)
 2001 — World Cup Qualifier, Edinburgh (8th)
 2002 — Commonwealth Games, Manchester (6th)
 2003 — Pan American Games, Santo Domingo (2nd)
 2004 — Olympic Qualifying Tournament, Madrid (11th)
 2004 — Pan Am Cup, London (2nd)
 2007 — Sultan Azlan Shah Cup, Malaysia
 2007 — Pan American Games, Rio de Janeiro Brazil (1st)
 2008- Sultan Azlan Shah Cup, Malaysia
 2008 — Olympic Games, Beijing (10th)
 2009 — Pan American Cup, Santiago Chile (1st)
 2009- Champions Challenge, Salta Argentina
 2010- Hockey World Cup, New Delhi India (11th)

References

External links
 

1976 births
Living people
Canadian expatriate sportspeople in the Netherlands
Canadian male field hockey players
Field hockey people from Ontario
Field hockey players at the 1998 Commonwealth Games
Field hockey players at the 2002 Commonwealth Games
Field hockey players at the 2007 Pan American Games
Field hockey players at the 2008 Summer Olympics
Olympic field hockey players of Canada
Sportspeople from Mississauga
Pan American Games gold medalists for Canada
Pan American Games silver medalists for Canada
Pan American Games medalists in field hockey
Commonwealth Games competitors for Canada
Canadian sportspeople of Indian descent
Canadian people of Punjabi descent
HC Rotterdam players
Medalists at the 2007 Pan American Games
2010 Men's Hockey World Cup players